New Zealand competed at the 1960 Winter Olympics in Squaw Valley, United States.  The country was represented by its Alpine skiing team of Bill Hunt, Cecelia Womersley, Patricia Prain, and Sam Chaffey.  No medals were earned.

Alpine skiing

Men

Women

References
Official Olympic Report, PDF format
 Olympic Winter Games 1960, full results by sports-reference.com

Nations at the 1960 Winter Olympics
1960
Winter Olympics